Manuel Incra Mamani was a Bolivian Incan cascarillero (bark and seed hunter) who found a cinchona tree that had a higher proportion of quinine than most others. It went into commercial cultivation, providing most of the world's quinine.

Life and work 
Mamani was an experienced bark and seed collector, and had worked for Charles Ledger since 1843. He was able to identify 29 different sorts of cinchona trees.

Mamani waited through four years of unsuitable weather (frosts destroyed the seeds from the high-quinine plants), and gave offerings to mountain spirits, in order to obtain a sample of seed from the high-quinine cinchona in 1865. The seeds that Mamani provided were sent to Ledger's brother, George, who then sold them to the Dutch government, who then cultivated plants in Java.

The plant that Mamani collected seed from was later named Cinchona ledgeriana. He is noted only as a "native" in some accounts of its finding and cultivation.

Local people disapproved of Mamani helping Ledger.

Death 
In 1871, whilst on a seed-collecting trip, Mamani was arrested, imprisoned and beaten. Some have suggested that this was likely because of his providing seeds to foreigners. Others suggest it was because he refused to identify his employer. He subsequently died of his injuries.

References 

19th-century Bolivian people
1871 deaths
Plant collectors